In computer  storage, SAF-TE (abbreviated from SCSI Accessed Fault-Tolerant Enclosure) is an industry standard to interface an enclosure in-band to a (parallel) SCSI subsystem in order to gain access to information or control for various elements and parameters. These include temperature, fan status, slot status (populated/empty), door status, power supplies, alarms, and indicators (e.g. LEDs, LCDs). Practically, any given SAF-TE device will only support a subset of all possible sensors or controls.

Scope

Many RAID controllers can utilize a SAF-TE "activated" backplane by detecting a swapped drive (after a defect) and automatically starting a rebuild. A passive subsystem usually requires a manual rescan and rebuild.

A SAF-TE device (SEP) is represented as a SCSI processor device that is polled every few seconds by e.g. the RAID controller software. Due to the low overhead required, impact on bus performance is negligible. For SAS or Fibre Channel systems, SAF-TE is replaced by the more standardized SCSI Enclosure Services (SES).

The most widely used version was defined in the SAF-TE Interface Specification Intermediate Review R041497, released on April 14, 1997 by nStor (now part of Seagate Technology) and Intel.

Command interface
Status requests are performed as READ BUFFER SCSI commands, enclosure action requests as WRITE BUFFER commands.

See also 

 International Blinking Pattern Interpretation (IBPI)
 Out-of-band signaling
 SGPIO (Serial General Purpose Input/Output)
 SCSI Enclosure Services (SES)
 
 hw.sensors

References

External links 
 
 SAF-TE as part of Intel's IPMI
 SAF-TE Intermediate Review R041497
 

Computer data storage
Computer hardware standards
SCSI
System administration